István Nagy (14 April 1939 – 22 October 1999) was a Hungarian footballer. He was born in Budapest. During his club career he played for MTK Hungária FC. For the Hungary national football team, he participated in the 1962 FIFA World Cup, the 1964 European Nations' Cup, and the 1966 FIFA World Cup.

References

1939 births
1999 deaths
Hungarian footballers
Hungary international footballers
1962 FIFA World Cup players
1964 European Nations' Cup players
1966 FIFA World Cup players
MTK Budapest FC players
Association football midfielders